Ælfsige (or Elfdig) was Bishop of Lindisfarne, perhaps appointed around 968. He perhaps died around 990.

Citations

References

External links
 

Bishops of Lindisfarne
10th-century English bishops
990 deaths
Year of birth unknown
Year of death uncertain